Suben is a municipality in the district of Schärding in the Austrian state of Upper Austria. It is not far from the Austrian-German border.

Geography
Suben lies in the Innviertel. About 13 percent of the municipality is forest, and 58 percent is farmland.

References

Cities and towns in Schärding District